The Northern Woods and Water Route is a  route through northern British Columbia, Alberta, Saskatchewan and Manitoba in Western Canada. As early as the 1950s, community groups came together to establish a northern travel route; this was proposed as the Northern Yellowhead Transportation Route. The Northern Woods and Water Route Association was established in 1974, and encouraged promotion of the route with the promise of an increase in tourist travel. The route was designated in 1974 and is well signed throughout its component highways. The route starts at Dawson Creek as the Spirit River Highway and ends at the Perimeter of Winnipeg, Manitoba, after running through the northern regions of the western provinces.   From west to east, the Northern Woods and Water Route (NWWR) incorporates portions of British Columbia Highway 49; Alberta Highways 49, 2A,  2, & 55; Saskatchewan Highways 55 & 9; Manitoba Provincial Road 283 and Trunk Highways 10, 5, 68 & 6. The halfway point of the NWWR is approximately at Goodsoil, Saskatchewan.

Fur traders and early settlers utilised the rivers and Red River cart roads such as Long Trail until the early 20th century when the railroad and bush planes supplemented travel to this northern boreal transition area.  Corduroy roads provided a means for early land vehicles to cross over muskeg and swamp.  Horse drawn ploughs filled low areas, settlers hauled gravel and cleared bush for the road ways surveyed along high elevations following lake and river shore lines.  Municipalities would grade and gravel roads providing transportation between trading centres.  The all-weather road arrived alongside of the NWWR association's impetus for a travel and tourism corridor along the northern area of the western provinces.  Traffic volume along the route is a major factor to determine highway classification, surface type, and construction upgrades.

Route description

British Columbia
  In British Columbia (BC), the NWWR starts in Dawson Creek at the intersection of BC Hwy 2 and BC Hwy 49.  west of the intersection is BC Hwy 97, where BC Hwy 97 north is the start of the Alaska Highway while BC Hwy 97 south is named the John Hart Highway. BC Hwy 49, also known as the Spirit River Highway, travels for  before reaching the Alberta border.

Alberta
The NWWR continues east into Alberta on Highway 49, the Spirit River Highway. Alberta Highway 49 contributes  to the NWWR in northwestern Alberta between Donnelly and the Alberta and BC border. The town of Spirit River's population is just over 1,000 and is supported by agriculture and the oil and gas industry creating an annual average daily traffic (AADT) near Spirit River that is about 2,000 vehicles per day (vpd). To the south is the Spirit River, a tributary of the Peace River, which is to the north. The village of Rycroft, "The Hub of the Peace", has a population over 600, and welcomes travellers with their tourism booth in a giant teepee at the junction  of Highway 49 and Highway 2 where the traffic volume increases to about 3,000 vpd. Wanham Grizzly Bear Prairie Museum is located at the junction of Highway 49 and Highway 773, where the AADT declines to about 1,000 vpd for the village of Wanham, which has a population around 600. Watino is an unincorporated area within Birch Hills County and the traffic volume declines to between 800 and 900 vpd. Bad Heart River is a tributary of the Peace River and flows through Watino. Donnelly is near the junction of Highway 49 and Highway 2 and is also west of Kimiswan Lake. At Donnelly, traffic volume rises to around 1,800, and the NWWR turns south before arriving at Highway 2A. The next connecting highway along the NWWR is Highway 2. One route would be to follow Highway 2 west from Donnelly to McLennan whenceforth it turns south through Kathleen and intersection Highway 679 until the junction with Highway 2A when the route turns east. McLennan holds Northern Woods and Water Route caravans every August. The other route would be to follow Highway 2A, a designated alternative route to Highway 2, by turning south at Donnelly staying on Highway 49 until the eastern turn on Highway 2A. From Donnelly to Athabasca, Alberta, Highway 2 contributes  to the NWWR scenic route across the western provinces. High Prairie on the West Prairie River is west of the intersection of Highway 749 and Highway 2, where traffic jumps to about 7,000 vpd. Enilda is a hamlet on the East Prairie River that is within Big Lakes County. Driftpile is a community on the Driftpile River within the Drift Pile River 150 Indian reserve. The Hill and Hollow Campsite and Bay Shore Resort Inc. are located at Faust, which is located on the south shore of Lesser Slave Lake along Highway 2. Within the Municipal District of Lesser Slave River No. 124 is the small hamlet of Wagner. Canyon Creek, Widewater and Slave Lake, “The Jewel of the North", are also on Lesser Slave Lake. The town of Athabasca, "Land of the Whispering Hills", on the Athabasca River has a population over 2,500 and marks the transition between the NWWR connector routes Highway 2 and Highway 55. Traffic volume around Athabasca ranges from 6,000 to 8,000 vpd according to AADT traffic counts at various areas. Lac La Biche is located south of Lac la Biche and Beaver Lake on the junction of Highway 36 and Highway 55, where traffic remains around 7,000 vpd. Sir Winston Churchill Provincial Park on Lac la Biche is to the north of the NWWR at this point. Rich Lake is in Lac La Biche County municipal district, and the traffic volume declines to around 800 vpd. La Corey, Beaver Crossing are along Highway 55, which is an asphalt highway and has yearly maintenance.

Saskatchewan
Saskatchewan (SK) has six travel corridors of which the Northern Woods and Water Route is the most northerly. The NWWR begins its journey in north western SK on SK Hwy 55, which crosses  of northern Saskatchewan. Pierceland, a small hamlet of the Beaver River No. 622 rural municipality (RM), is located at the junction of SK Hwy 55, SK Hwy 950 north and SK Hwy 21 south where traffic volume is around 1,000 vpd. Rapid View is an unincorporated area of the RM of Meadow Lake No. 588 RM. The town of Meadow Lake is located on the north-western shore of Meadow Lake where the AADT is approximately 1,700 to 2,500 vpd. Green Lake, located at the intersection of SK Hwy 55 and SK Hwy 155, is at the northern tip of Green Lake. Traffic volume is considerably higher west of Green River at about 900 vpd dropping to about 350 to the east. Between Green Lake and Shellbrook, the NWWR bears south east skirting around the western edge of the Prince Albert National Park. The NWWR follows the eastern shoreline of Cowan Lake until the southern tip at Big River which is just west of Delaronde Lake, and the highway volume at this point is about 1,000 vpd. Big River No. 555 RM provides civic administration to Bodmin. Debden, a village of about 350, is at the SK Hwy 55 and SK Hwy 793 junction where traffic volume is about 850 vpd to the north and around 1,200 vpd to the south of the intersection. Polwarth, at the SK Hwy 55 and SK Hwy 793 south junction, is a hamlet of Canwood No. 494 RM. Shellbrook is at the intersection of SK Hwy 55 and SK Hwy 240 where the AADT increases to about 2,000 vpd. At Shellbrook, the  concurrency with SK Hwy 3 begins and the multiplex ends in Prince Albert. Crutwell, a hamlet of Shellbrook No. 493 RM, is located south of the NWWR, and north of the North Saskatchewan River. On the NWWR, at Crutwell, the traffic volume rises to about 3,100. At the city of Prince Albert SK Hwy 55 connects with SK Hwy 3 and SK Hwy 2. Traffic volume west of the city is about 4200 vpd, whereas east of the city the AADT drops to approximately 2,090 vpd. Prince Albert, located on the North Saskatchewan River, is within  of the Prince Albert National Park. Meath Park is a village of about 200 at the junction of  SK Hwy 55, SK Hwy 355 and SK Hwy 120 where the traffic volume is heaviest west towards Prince Albert at about 2,000 vpd, and the AADT trickles down to 1,000 vpd east of Meath Park. The NWWR is located in the Boreal transition ecoregion which features agricultural fields on the parkland mixed with dense taiga and sparse population. Over the next  there are three small unincorporated areas with populations less than 100; Weirdale is found in the Garden River No. 490 RM; Foxford in Paddockwood No. 520, RM; and Shipman of Torch River No. 488 RM. At the  SK Hwy 55 and SK hwy 255 junction is the village of Smeaton, and at the  SK Hwy 55 and SK Hwy 691 junction is the hamlet of Snowden. Garrick is a part of Torch River No. 488 RM and Love, a village of around 60, marks a turn south east for the NWWR. White Fox, a village of about 375 is  near the  SK Hwy 55 and SK Hwy 35 intersection where the traffic volume raises to 1,700 vpd. At the intersection, the NWWR turns south and a  concurrency begins until the town of Nipawin. Nipawin on the Saskatchewan River, and near both Tobin Lake and Codette Lake is home to the Northern Woods and Water Route Association. West of Nipawin until the SK Hwy 23 intersection the traffic volume remain around 1,300 vpd and following the intersection to the east the traffic falls to about 400 vpd. There are no communities along the SK Hwy 9 route which contributes  to the entire NWWR. At the junction between SK Hwy 55 and Sk hwy 9, the AADT is less than 100 vpd.

Manitoba
Travel along the NWWR enters Manitoba via the MB PR 283 west ending at The Pas, a town of about 5,500 where the AADT increases to 980 vpd. MB PR 283 provides  of the NWWR where the economy has been supported by the fur trade, trapping, mining, fishing, logging and agricultural industries. The Pas, which has not yet incorporated as a city (requisite population of 5,000), is located south of the Saskatchewan River and south of the Clearwater Lake Provincial Park and Cormorant Provincial Forest. Pasquia River flows through The Pas, and travels west of the NWWR until it turns west to Saskatchewan near Westray. Freshford and Westray are both within the R.M. of Kelsey. Overflowing River, a small community with less than 100 residents is a part of the Unorganized Division No. 21. Overflowing River community is located on the Overflowing River and at the north-west tip of Dawson Bay of Lake Winnipegosis whereas Makefing is east of the Porcupine Provincial Forest. Bellsite, Novra, and Birch River are all small unorganised areas of Mountain (North) RM located west of Swan Lake. Bowsman with a population of over 300, is the next largest village along the NWWR after The Pas. North of Swan River, the AADT increases to about 2,000 vpd and the NWWR changes course at Swan River and bears east. Minitonas is on the Favel River and at the junction of  MB PTH 10 and MB PR 366 south. West of MB PTH 10 and MB PR 268 north intersection, traffic volume is over 1,100 vpd, and east of MB PR 268 traffic declines to about 750 vpd. Renwer is a small community found in the Minitonas RM. The MB PTH 10 and MB PTH 20 intersection is located at the hamlet of Cowan in Mountain (South) RM and here the NWWR resumes its route south. Sclater and Pine River two places with populations less than 100 are also found in Mountain (South) RM. The NWWR is to the east of Duck Mountain Provincial Park and Duck Mountain Provincial Forest and west of Lake Winnipegosis. Garland is located at the intersection of MB PR 489 east, MB PR 367 west, MB PTH 10A and MB PTH 10. Ethelbert, a small hamlet of the R.M. of Ethelbert, is located at the intersection of MB PR 269 west, MB PR 274 south and MB PTH 10. The AADT along MB PTH 10 declines to about 680 vpd near this intersection. Ashville is located north of the MB PTH 10 and MB PTH 5 junction in this parkland area of R.M. of Gilbert Plains. The city of Dauphin is located north of Riding Mountain National Park and south of Dauphin Lake. Near this city, the traffic volume jumps to 2,750 vpd, with the heaviest day of the week being Friday, and the highest volume occurring between April and October during daylight hours. Ochre River is located at the junction of MB PTH 10 and MB PR 582 south of Rainbow Beach Provincial Park. Ste. Rose du Lac, a town of about 1,000, is at the intersection of MB PTH 5, MB PTH 68 and MB PR 276. Near this intersection, the traffic volume declines to around 1,800 vpd. At Ste. Shergrove is located close to the turn off north from the easterly direction of MB PTH 68. Ebb and Flow Lake is east of Eddystone which is part of R.M. of Alonsa. Wapah, another small community, is between Ebb and Flow Lake, and Lake Manitoba.  [[Rural Municipality of Siglunes
|R.M. of Siglunes]] administrates civic affairs for Vogar which is south of Dog Lake.  At Vogar the NWWR returns to an east direction.  At Mulvihill the NWWR turns south and the  concurrency between MB PTH 68 and MB PTH 6 begins.  At Eriksdale, MB PTH 68 turns east and the concurrency between MB PTH 68 and MB PTH 6 ends, however the NWWR continues on MB PTH 6 in a southerly direction for the final  leg of the travel corridor.  Deerhorn is found in the R.M. of Eriksdale.  The NWWR continues south along PTH 6 and parallel to the eastern shores of Lake Manitoba.  Lundar and Clarkleigh are both located in R.M. of Coldwell. The unincorporated area of Lundar is located at the intersection of MB PR 418 east, PTH 6, and MB PR 419.  MB PR 419 west provides access to the Lundar Beach Provincial Park.  The hamlet of Clarkleigh is located at the intersection of MB PTH 6, and MB PR 229 east. Oakpoint is at the intersection of MB PTH 6, and MB PR 419, and St. Laurent is at MB PTH 6 and MB PR 415.  The hamlet of Lake Francis is located west of West Shoal Lake.  Both Woodlands and Warren are unincorporated areas with small populations below 100 of R.M. of Woodlands. The AADT along the NWWR increases to over 2,500 vpd near these communities.  Woodlands is at thei intersection of PTH 6 and MB PR 518 and Warren is located at MB PTH 67 and MB PTH 6.  Grosse Isle is the last hamlet along NWWR before arriving at Perimeter Highway, the PTH 101 around Winnipeg, the ending terminus of the NWWR.

History

The Long Trail followed the Peace River 530 across northern AB.  As the flow of traffic increased due to the fur trade industry along the Long Trail, stopping places developed providing rest and food for travelers.  In 1923, the three routes out of Lac La Biche were to the west, which corresponds to the route of AB Hwy 55 along the south shores of Lesser Slave Lake. Edmonton or Saddle Lake trail departed to the south, which would be the initial stages of AB Hwy 55 out of Lac La Biche.   Heart Lake trail traveled northeast from Lac La Biche, which would form a base for secondary AB Hwy 858.  Work was done on the Athabaska Trail to make it passable for motor traffic as many roads had been graded.  Before stopping places developed, caches were set up at stopping points along the way.  Before the arrival of rails the waterways such as the Lesser Slave Lake near Athabasca, Alberta and the Saskatchewan River near Prince Albert were traversed by long boat, canoe, and steamship. The rail did not reach the northern areas until the early twentieth century due to the geological hurdles of mountains, muskeg, swamp, boreal forest, and river systems  to traverse.  A huge flood in 1899 near The Pas left no ground to walk upon, yet the railway track construction work began in 1906, with more continuing in 1911. In 1928, the Canadian Pacific Railway (CPR) surveyed their line across the Saskatchewan River near Prince Albert, and contractors started work on the bridge.  The upper deck served the train, and the lower deck was built for highway traffic opening for vehicles in 1932. In 1929, travel was overland on trails, and rivers were forded in many places.

As early as 1896 oil wells were drilled at Athabasca supplementing the rich soils and grain growing economy.  There was a rush of settlers to the area in the early 20th century, at this time transportation for goods was freighted on Lesser Slave Lake to connecting river routes or via early rail lines overland.  Fortune seekers during the gold rush of 1896 traveled north through Edmonton or took the rail as far north as Prince Albert.  The westerly route proceeded from Prince Albert to Green Lake, and from there to the Long Trail by following the Beaver River to the Churchill River, Athabaska, Slave and Mackenzie rivers until bearing north following the rivers of the Yukon to Dawson City.

The first garage to service McLaughlin cars opened in High River as early as 1909. In 1912 travelers could stop here at a filling station for their automobiles.
  The Pas, Manitoba saw its first car arrive in 1916, yet it had been active with fur trading posts and explorers in the area since 1741.

Settlers would not only haul gravel for the new roadways, but they also cleared brush for the road allowance. Early roads did not follow the road allowances of the Dominion Land Survey, but rather kept to higher ground, however due to the nature of the Boreal transition ecoregion, muskegs and swamps still needed to be traversed. The first pioneers filled these watery areas with branches and brush and proceeded along their trip. Later corduroy roads were built across these areas were traffic got mired in the mud. A corduroy road consisted of logs laid across the road as a rail tie is across the rail line, however the logs were placed one against another and mud filled between the logs for a smoother surface.

Debden, Saskatchewan had a horse and caboose taxi for settlers as early as 1912 providing regular trips to Prince Albert and taking children to school.  In 1945, the taxi service was provided by automobile. Bush planes arrived in the 1920s to the northern bus areas providing communication in an era where travel was limited when the snow fell, or the water froze. In 1968, High Prairie was looking forward to hard surface construction for AB Hwy 2 which would supplement the economic trading base with tourism. A new bridge across the Saskatchewan River at Prince Albert was erected in 1974, and caused re-routing of the highway by one and a half miles (2.4 km).
Community groups came together as early as the 1950s to establish a northern travel route.

The early name proposed for these travel corridor was the Northern Yellowhead Transportation Route.  The Northern Woods and Water Route Association was established in 1974, their further promotion of the route was to increase tourist travel.  George R. Stephenson (1916–2003), of McLennan was one of the first facilitators to organise the Northern Woods and Water Route across Western Canada in 1974.  Henry Andres was chairman of the Northern Woods and Water Association for eight years wherein the association worked on placing NWWR signs both on provincial highways and maps.  Brochures promoting tourism were printed, and the association sponsored more than five cavalcades where wagons would traverse the route between Winnipeg and Dawson Creek promoting tourism and the creation of the travel corridor.   On August 21, 1975, one of these Northern Woods and Water Cavalcades stopped at Nipawin Regional Park and toured Nipawin.

Current engineering concerns would be to determine maintenance of the current travel corridor and construction upgrades.  The route does contain a variety of road surfaces ranging from asphalt concrete, thin membrane surface (TMS), granular pavements and gravel highway.  Insight into current surface texture, traffic volume, traffic speed, percentage of loaded trucks, climate variations, construction costs and time as well as available materials will affect upgrade procedures.  The entire route is paved except for a Class 4 gravel highway segment between Nipawin and the Manitoba border.  Here the traffic volume declines to 80 and 85 vpd and two checkpoints near the Manitoba border.

Major intersections

See also

Notes

References

Further reading
The  Northern Woods & Water Route : Highway Guide  By Northern Woods and Water Route Association, Northern Woods and Water Route Association, Published by Victory Impressions, 1994, 35 pages
A Study of the Inter-Provincial Northern Woods and Water Route: Phase 1 Published by Consortium 4, 1976
Canada By Andrea Schulte-Peevers Edition: 9, illustrated Published by Lonely Planet, 2005 . 912 pages - Page 530
Historic Trails Alberta by Mark Anderako.  Gelnbow Alberta Institute, Historical Paper N. 2, Kelly, L.V. North with Peace River Jim.
Grourard - Peace River Trail by Edith Van Kleek.  'Our Trail North'
The Land of the Lobstick, the log of a canoe journey in The Pas district of northern Manitoba

External links

Northern Woods and Water Highway
Canadian Highway Markers
Town of McLennan Alberta
Attractions and Events Rural Municipality of Ochre River
EcoInformatics International Inc.